Duško Čelica (Serbian Cyrillic: Душко Челица, born 18 August 1986) is a Bosnian handball player who plays for RK Vogošća and for the Bosnian national handball team.

Career

He started playing handball for local club RK Kozara in Kozarska Dubica, the town in Bosnia and Herzegovina where he was born.

PPD Zagreb 
Čelica sign for PPD Zagreb in December 2014. He scored game-winning goal from 15 meters against Naturhouse La Rioja during EHF Champions League group stage game. In May 2015 Čelica is loaned out to Al Sadd SC.

Career statistics

EHF Champions League

IHF Super Globe

International

Achievements
Croatian Premier Handball League:
Winner: 2015
 Croatian Handball Cup :
Winner: 2015

References

External links
EHF profile 

1986 births
Living people
Bosnia and Herzegovina male handball players
People from Dubica, Bosnia and Herzegovina
RK Zagreb players
Serbs of Bosnia and Herzegovina